Mark Fitler Rockefeller (born January 26, 1967) is a fourth-generation member of the Rockefeller family. He is the younger son of former U.S. Vice President Nelson A. Rockefeller (1908–1979) and Happy Rockefeller (1926–2015). He is the grandson of American financer John D. Rockefeller Jr. and the great grandson of Standard Oil co-founder John D. Rockefeller. Rockefeller was chairman of the board of directors of the National Fish and Wildlife Foundation in 2010.

Early life
Rockefeller grew up at Kykuit, the central mansion at his family's estate in Pocantico, Westchester County, in New York State. He is an alumnus of the Buckley School, Deerfield Academy (1985), Princeton University (BA 1989), and Harvard University (MBA 1996). He played football, basketball, and baseball at Deerfield, and played football at Princeton as a walk-on.

Career
Rockefeller and his former wife own South Fork Lodge and South Fork Outfitters, both in Swan Valley, Idaho. Previously, he was an associate in the Acquisition Finance Group at Chase Securities, Inc.

In 1999 he was elected chairman of the non-profit organization, Historic Hudson Valley, an organization founded in 1951 by his grandfather, John D. Rockefeller Jr. Rockefeller's older brother, Nelson Rockefeller Jr., has also served on its board.

In a 2013 article about Federal farm subsidy programs, the New York Post reported that 1,500 affluent New Yorkers had received payments. Among them was Rockefeller, who received $342,634 in taxpayer money over the course of ten years from 2001 to 2011 for allowing farmland to return to its natural condition.

Personal life
In 1998, Rockefeller married Renee Anne Anisko (born 1968) at the Church of the Magdalene in Pocantico Hills. She has a Juris Doctor degree cum laude from Temple University Beasley School of Law. They have four children. They divorced in 2020.

References

Rockefeller family
Winthrop family
1967 births
Living people
Children of vice presidents of the United States
Deerfield Academy alumni
Princeton Tigers football players
American philanthropists
Princeton University alumni
Harvard Business School alumni
Meade family